Aglossosia persimilis is a moth of the  subfamily Arctiinae. It is found in Kenya.

References

Endemic moths of Kenya
Lithosiini
Moths of Africa
Moths described in 1914